Deltote glauca is a moth of the  family Noctuidae. It is found in Jamaica.

References

Moths described in 1910
Acontiinae